Simcoe (Dennison Field) Airport  is located  southeast of Simcoe, Ontario, Canada.

References

Registered aerodromes in Ontario
Buildings and structures in Norfolk County, Ontario
Transport in Norfolk County, Ontario